The 1930 Milan–San Remo was the 23rd edition of the Milan–San Remo cycle race and was held on 30 March 1930. The race started in Milan and finished in San Remo. The race was won by Michele Mara.

General classification

References

1930
1930 in road cycling
1930 in Italian sport
March 1930 sports events